Austin Walsh may refer to:

 Austin Walsh (baseball) (1891–1955), left fielder for the Chicago Federals baseball team
 Austin Walsh (hurler) (born 1977), Irish hurler